Lonely Tears in Chinatown is a track from Modern Talking's fourth  album In the Middle of Nowhere. The song is composed and written by Dieter Bohlen and was released as a single in Spain's market only where it peaked at No.9.

The single was released in Spain instead of "Give Me Peace on Earth" which was officially the second single from the In the Middle of Nowhere.

Track listing 
7" (Hansa 108 838) (BMG) year 1987

12" (Hansa 608 838) (BMG) year 1987

Charts

Credits 
 Music: Dieter Bohlen
 Lyrics: Dieter Bohlen
 Lead vocals: Thomas Anders
 Producer: Dieter Bohlen
 Arrangement: Dieter Bohlen
 Co-producer: Luis Rodríguez

References

External links 
 Discogs release

Modern Talking songs
1986 songs
1987 singles
Songs written by Dieter Bohlen
Song recordings produced by Dieter Bohlen
Hansa Records singles